Modern Welding Company is the country's largest supplier of underground and aboveground steel storage tanks for flammable and combustible liquids. The company also manufactures chemical storage tanks and ASME pressure vessels, performs steel fabrication, and constructs and installs natural gas pipelines. Modern is headquartered in Owensboro, Kentucky and has ten manufacturing subsidiaries throughout the United States.

History

Modern Welding Company was founded in June 1932 in Owensboro, Kentucky in a small shop located near the Ohio River at 1st and Frederica Street where the Commonwealth of Kentucky office building is today. The company was founded by John G. Barnard (1898–1982), known as "Mr. Pete". In 1937 the company expanded with the acquisition of a plant in Madisonville, Kentucky.

References

Manufacturing companies based in Kentucky
Owensboro, Kentucky
1932 establishments in Kentucky
Manufacturing companies established in 1932